Andrés Indriðason (7 August 1941 – 10 July 2020) was an Icelandic television producer, director, screenwriter, playwright, author of children's books, and a child actor.

Career 

Andrés worked as a producer for the public television channel Sjónvarpið from its foundation in 1966 until 1985, and has since been a freelance producer. He was the executive producer of the quiz show Gettu betur for 25 years.

Filmography 
Writer:

 1996Áramótaskaup 1996 (TV Movie)
 1991Áramótaskaup 1991 (TV Movie)
 1989Áramótaskaup 1989 (TV Special)
 1983Áramótaskaup 1983 (TV Special)
 1982Ég mundi segja hó (TV Movie)
 1980Veiðiferðin
 1974Áramótaskaup (TV Special)
 1966Áramótaskaup (TV Special)

Hide Producer:

 1986Gettu betur (TV Series) (executive producer - 1991)

Hide Production manager:

 1976Undraland (TV Movie) (unit manager)

References

External links 
 

Indriðason, Andrés
Indriðason, Andrés
Icelandic television producers